is an uninhabited island in Suzu, Ishikawa, Japan.

According to folklore, the island was given the name "Mitsukejima" by the Buddhist monk, scholar, and artist, Kūkai, who was the first to discover the island while travelling from Sado Island.

Mitsukejima is approximately 150 metres long, 50 metres wide, and 30 metres above sea level. It is composed of Neogene period diatomaceous earth, the raw materials commonly used for shichirin, a portable clay cooking stove which is a specialty product of Suzu. The top of the island is covered with Japanese black pine and Japanese knotweed. Mitsukejima is known as a scenic spot of the Noto Hantō Quasi-National Park, and attracts many tourists.

See also

 Noto Hantō Quasi-National Park
 Desert island
 List of islands

External links

Tourism ISHIKAWA (Official Ishikawa Travel Guide) - Mitsukejima Island
Experience Kanazawa - Mitsukejima Island

Islands of the Sea of Japan
Tourist attractions in Ishikawa Prefecture
Islands of Ishikawa Prefecture
Uninhabited islands of Japan
Suzu, Ishikawa